was one of fourteen s built for the Imperial Japanese Navy during World War II.

Background and description
The Etorofu class was an improved version of the preceding  with a greater emphasis on anti-submarine warfare.

The main armament of the Etorofu class consisted of three Type 3  guns in single mounts, one superfiring pair aft and one mount forward of the superstructure. They were built with four Type 96  anti-aircraft guns in two twin-gun mounts, but the total was increased to 15 guns by August 1943. 36 depth charges were stowed aboard initially, but this later increased by August 1943 to 60 depth charges with a Type 97  trench mortar and six depth charge throwers. They received Type 22 and Type 13 radars and Type 93 sonar in 1943–44.

Construction and career
Tsushima was launched by Tsurumi on 20 March 1943 and completed on 15 August. She served on repatriation duties until 1947 when she was turned over to the Republic of China Navy on 31 July and renamed Lin An.

Notes

References
 

World War II naval ships of Japan
Etorofu-class escort ships
1943 ships
Ships built in Japan
Ships of the Republic of China Navy